Marion Byron (born Miriam Bilenkin; 1911 – 1985) was an American movie comedian.

Early years
Born in Dayton, Ohio, Byron was one of five daughters of Louis and Bertha Bilenkin.

Career

She made her first stage appearance at the age of 13 and followed it with a role in Hollywood Music Box Review opposite Fanny Brice.It was while appearing in this production that she was given the nickname 'Peanuts' on account of her short stature. While appearing in 'The Strawberry Blonde', she came to the attention of Buster Keaton who signed her as his leading lady in the film Steamboat Bill, Jr. in 1928 when she was just 16. From there she was hired by Hal Roach who teamed her with Anita Garvin in a bid to create a female version of Laurel & Hardy. The pairing was not a commercial success and they made just three short features between 1928-9 - Feed 'Em and Weep (1928), Going Ga-Ga (1928) and A Pair of Tights (1929).

She left the Roach studio before it made talking comedies, then worked in musical features, like the Vitaphone film Broadway Babies (1929) with Alice White, and the early Technicolor feature Golden Dawn (1930).

Her parts slowly got smaller until they were unbilled walk-ons in movies like Meet the Baron (1933), starring Jack Pearl and Hips Hips Hooray (1934) with Wheeler & Woolsey; she returned to the Hal Roach studio for a bit part in the Charley Chase short It Happened One Day (1934). Her final screen appearance was as a baby nurse to the Dionne Quintuplets in Five of a Kind (1938).

Family
Byron married screenwriter Lou Breslow in 1932 and they had two sons, Lawrence and Daniel. They remained together until her death in Santa Monica on July 5, 1985, following a long illness. Her ashes were later scattered in the sea.

Selected filmography
 Five of a Kind (1938)
 Swellhead (1935)
 Gift of Gab (1934)
 It Happened One Day (1934)
 Hips, Hips, Hooray! (1933)
 Only Yesterday (1933)
 Meet the Baron (1933)
 Husbands’ Reunion (1933)
 College Humor (1933)   
 Melody Cruise (1933)
 Breed of the Border (1933)
 The Crime of the Century (1933)
 The Curse of a Broken Heart (1933)
 Lucky Devils (1933)
 Trouble in Paradise (1932)
 They Call It Sin (1932)
 Love Me Tonight (1933)
 The Hollywood Handicap (1932)
 Week Ends Only (1932)
 The Tenderfoot (1932)
 The Heart of New York  (1932)
 Running Hollywood (1932)
 Working Girls (1931)
 Children of Dreams (1931)
 Girls Demand Excitement (1931)
 The Bad Man (1930)
 The Matrimonial Bed (1930)
 Golden Dawn (1930)
 Song of the West (1930)
 Playing Around (1930)
 Show of Shows (1929)
 The Forward Pass (1929) - Mazie
 So Long Letty (1929)
 Social Sinners (1929)
 Broadway Babies (1929)
 The Unkissed Man (1929)
 His Captive Woman (1929)
 A Pair of Tights (1929)
 Going Ga–Ga (1929)
 Is Everybody Happy? (1929)
 Feed’em and Weep (1928)
 The Boy Friend (1928)
 Plastered in Paris (1928)
 Steamboat Bill, Jr. (1928)

References

External links

 
 

1911 births
1985 deaths
American film actresses
American silent film actresses
Actresses from Dayton, Ohio
20th-century American actresses
Hal Roach Studios short film series
Comedians from Ohio
20th-century American comedians